Alfred Herbert Horsfall DSO (29 January 1871 – 26 November 1944) was an Australian military surgeon.

History
Horsfall was born at Fitzroy in Melbourne to headmaster Jonas Horsfall and Emily, née Nichols. He graduated from the University of Melbourne with a Master of Surgery in 1893 and soon moved to Newcastle, where he was appointed medical superintendent at Newcastle Hospital; he also became a local alderman and was elected president of the Newcastle Scientific Society. He was commissioned a lieutenant in the 2nd New South Wales Army Medical Corps Contingent in January 1900 and saw action during the Boer War, serving in the Orange Free State, the Transvaal and the Orange River Colony. He was mentioned in despatches and awarded the Distinguished Service Order for his service. After the war he returned to Newcastle. He married Gertrude Emily Stokes at Leichhardt in Sydney on 21 April 1903.

Horsfall continued to serve in the Medical Corps but he resigned as a major in 1914, enlisting in the British Territorial Army. He served in Greece and the Suez Canal during First World War, supervising the canal's sanitation and serving as surgeon specialist in Alexandria until January 1917, when he was sent to England as an invalid. He returned to active service in August, serving in Palestine until he was invalided again. He supervised the 82nd General Hospital in Salonika from March to October 1918. Following the end of the war Horsfall based himself in England but continued to travel widely. A staunch advocate of the British Empire, he published several pamphlets supporting migration and the Britishness of the dominions. He was in Australia from 1923 to 1926 (during which time he ran for the Australian House of Representatives as a Nationalist), and on returning to England he lectured for the Social and Political Education League. Horsfall died in London in 1944.

References

1871 births
1944 deaths
Companions of the Distinguished Service Order
Australian surgeons
Military personnel from Melbourne
Melbourne Medical School alumni
Australian Army soldiers
People from Newcastle, New South Wales